Ron Mullen (born 1939) is an American politician. He served as mayor of Austin, Texas from 1983 to 1985. He also served on Austin City Council from 1977 to 1983. He is an insurance broker. Mullen married Caroline Elizabeth King on December 29, 1959. His wife died on November 19, 2019. Married Lynnda Carter on July 25th, 2021.

References

Mayors of Austin, Texas
Living people
1939 births